Nagrom was a town in King County, Washington, United States.

History 
A logging company town, Nagrom was located in the Green River watershed between Kanaskat and Lester. The town was built by the Morgan Lumber Company and named after Elmer G. Morgan, the company founder and owner ("Nagrom" is "Morgan" spelled backward). The site was chosen for its access to timber and suitability to build a sawmill and mill pond. In 1910, Morgan petitioned the Northern Pacific Railway, which operated the rail line out of Puget Sound and up over Stampede Pass, to build a spur into the small town. The railway balked, but Morgan persisted and eventually the railway relented. The spur into town was built in 1911. A post office was established that same year, along with a telephone and telegraph exchange.

Between 1914 and 1918, rivers and streams flooded in the city of Tacoma's watershed, which was located in and around the town of Nagrom, sweeping sewage and contaminated water from the company settlement into the city's water supply. Worries about typhoid, a common health risk of the era, caused health officials to instruct residents living downstream from company settlements like Lester, Baldi, and Nagrom to boil their drinking water to reduce typhoid-related illnesses.

From 1911 to 1924, the Morgan Lumber Company continued to work the area for timber and to run the sawmill at Nagrom. In 1921-22 the population topped out for this town with an estimated 450 residents. In 1924, however, the company went out of business, presumably due to a post-World War I fall in lumber prices. Logging continued, but at a slower pace, as trucks began replacing railroad in the logging industry. The U.S. Forest Service began managing the forested land in the area in the 1930s with the help of the Civilian Conservation Corps.

Decline 
The city of Tacoma acquired the water rights on the Green River c. 1910. In the first half of the 1950s, the city's utility arm, today's Tacoma Public Utilities, began buying private land along the banks of the river between their intake at Headworks (just east of Kanaskat), eastwards to the railroad and logging town of Lester. Beginning with the construction of the Howard Hanson Dam, the city limited access between Headworks and Lester, installing gates at various access points to the Green River watershed. In about 1967, the city purchased the entire townsite of Lester from the Northern Pacific Railway. By 1984, most residents had moved out, the rail line was mothballed by the NP's corporate descendant, the Burlington Northern Railroad, and all the former communities along the rail line had become ghost towns. Today there are no residents in Nagrom.

Geography
The town was located at

References

Ghost towns in King County, Washington
Ghost towns in Washington (state)